Richard Wolffenstein may refer to:

Richard Wolffenstein (chemist) (1864–1926), German chemist
Richard Wolffenstein (architect) (1846–1919), German architect